Derrick Shepard may refer to:

 Derrick Shepard (wide receiver), American football wide receiver
 Derrick Shepard (defensive lineman), American football defensive lineman